
Year 672 (DCLXXII) was a leap year starting on Thursday (link will display the full calendar) of the Julian calendar. The denomination 672 for this year has been used since the early medieval period, when the Anno Domini calendar era became the prevalent method in Europe for naming years.

Events 
 By place 
 Europe 
 Wamba succeeds Recceswinth as king of the Visigoths. After ascending to the throne he faces a revolt from Hilderic, governor of Nîmes, who has himself aspired to the kingship. He is supported by Gumild, bishop of Maguelone. Wamba sends dux Paulus to Septimania (Southern France) to end the hostilities, but on his arrival at Narbonne, Paulus proclaims himself king.

 Britain 
 King Cenwalh of Wessex dies after a 31-year reign, in which he has lost much of his territory to Welsh and Mercian forces. He is succeeded by his widow Seaxburh. His sub-kings divide Wessex amongst themselves (approximate date).

 Asia 
 January 7 – Emperor Tenji dies after a 10-year reign, in which he has given the Fujiwara clan its name. Following his death, there ensues a succession dispute between Tenji's 14 children (many by different mothers). He is succeeded by his favorite son Kōbun, age 23, who was the first accorded with the title Daijō-daijin.   
 August 21 – Kōbun is deposed after 8 months, during a brief but violent battle called the Jinshin War. He is succeeded by his uncle Ōama, who becomes the 40th emperor of Japan with support from the Fujiwara family. He takes the name Tenmu, and begins a reign that will continue until 686.

 Americas 
 As part of the Second Tikal-Calakmul War, B'alaj Chan K'awiil is again forced to abandon Dos Pilas, after it is attacked by an insurgency led by Nuun Ujol Chaak against Calakmul.

 By topic 
 Literature 
 Cædmon, Anglo-Saxon poet, writes a nine-line hymn on the Creation. A onetime illiterate herdsman, he becomes a monk under the rule of Hilda of Whitby, where he will turn various biblical themes into vernacular poetry (approximate date).

 Religion 
 January 27 – Pope Vitalian dies at Rome after a reign of more than 14 years. He is succeeded by Adeodatus II  as the 77th pope.
 Máel Ruba, Irish abbot, founds one of the first Christian monasteries in Applecross (Scotland) located in hostile Pictish territory.
 Wilfrid, bishop of York, brings stonemasons, plasterers and glaziers from France and Italy to build Ripon Cathedral (England).

Births 
 Bede, Anglo-Saxon theologian and historian (approximate date)
 Chilperic II, king of the Franks (approximate date)
 Yazid ibn al-Muhallab, Muslim governor (d. 720)

Deaths

 January 7 – Tenji, emperor of Japan (b. 626)
 January 27 – Pope Vitalian
 March 2 – Chad of Mercia, Anglo-Saxon abbot
 August 21 – Kōbun, emperor of Japan (b. 648)

Date unknown
 Cenwalh, king of Wessex (approximate date) 
 Jiang Ke, general of the Tang Dynasty
 Recceswinth, king of the Visigoths 
 Xu Jingzong, chancellor of the Tang Dynasty (b. 592)

References